In computing, the Apache HTTP Server, an open-source HTTP server, comprises a small core for HTTP request/response processing and for Multi-Processing Modules (MPM) which dispatches data processing to threads or processes. Many additional modules (or "mods"
) are available to extend the core functionality for special purposes.

The following is a list of all the first- and third-party modules available for the most recent stable release of Apache web server:

The following is a list of historical first- and third-party modules available for prior versions of the Apache web server:

References